This is a list of lineages of Tulkus, said to be reincarnated Tibetan Buddhist masters.

Arjia Rinpoche (on the 8th incarnation)
Bardor Rinpoche (on the 3rd incarnation)
 Buli Trelku (11th reincarnation.1st: Phagpa Magapa, 2nd: Tsang Lekdrup, 3rd: Yudra Ningpo, 4th Choeing Rangdrol, 5th Choing Lhuendup, 6th Kencho Gyeltshen, 7th Tenzin Namgyel, 8th Sherub Jungney, 9th Shacha Namgyel, 10th Khachap Dorji & current 11th Buli Trelku Longchen Gyepa Sonam Loday)
Chagdud Rinpoche
Changkya Khutukhtu
Chetsang Rinpoche
Chungtsang Rinpoche
Dalai Lama (on the 14th incarnation)
Dudjom Rinpoche
Dzigar Kongtrul Rinpoche (on the 2nd or 3rd incarnation)
Dzogchen Rinpoche (on the 7th incarnation)
Dzogchen Ponlop Rinpoche (on the 7th incarnation)
Goshir Gyaltsab (on the 12th incarnation)
Gyalwang Drukpa (on the 12th incarnation)
Jamgon Kongtrul (on the 4th incarnation, disputed)
Jamyang Khyentse Wangpo
Jamyang Shêpa (on the 6th incarnation)
Jebtsundamba Khutuktu (on the 9th incarnation)
Jetsunma Ahkon Lhamo
Ju Mipham
Kalu Rinpoche (on the 2nd incarnation)
Karma Chagme (current is 7th incarnation)
Karmapa (on the 17th incarnation, disputed)
Khamtrul Rinpoche
Khandro Rinpoche
Khenpo Shenga
Mangshya Tulku (on the 4th incarnation, currently Tulku Anshul Rinpoche)
Ngawang Jigdral Rinpoche
Pagbalha Hutugtu (on the 11th incarnation, currently Pagbalha Geleg Namgyai)
Panchen Lama (on the 11th incarnation, disputed, one appointed by the Chinese government)
Pawo (on the 11th incarnation)
Penor Rinpoche (3rd incarnation deceased in 2009)
Reting Rinpoche (on the 6th or 7th incarnation, disputed, one appointed by Chinese government)
Samding Dorje Phagmo (on the 12th incarnation, another Dorje Phagmo line in Bhutan)
Shamarpa (14th incarnation died 2014)
Sogyal Rinpoche
Tai Situpa (on the 12th incarnation)
Taktser Rinpoche (extinguished in 2008)
Tarthang Tulku
Tenzin Delek Rinpoche
Thrangu Rinpoche (on the 9th incarnation)
Thubten Yeshe (on the 2nd incarnation, rejected by current tulku, who is committed to spiritual discovery in a post-modern context)
Traleg Kyabgon Rinpoche (on the 10th incarnation)
Trungpa (on the 12th incarnation)
Trungram Gyaltrul Rinpoche (on the 4th incarnation)
Tsem Tulku Rinpoche (3rd incarnation died 2019)
Tulku Urgyen Rinpoche  (on the 2nd incarnation?)
Yongey Mingyur Rinpoche
Zasep Tulku Rinpoche (on the 13th incarnation)
Zhabdrung Rinpoche (on the 14th incarnation)
Zim'og Rinpoche

References